The yellow-tailed rat (Rattus xanthurus) is a species of rodent in the family Muridae.
It is found only in northeastern Sulawesi, Indonesia.

References

Rattus
Rodents of Sulawesi
Mammals described in 1867
Taxonomy articles created by Polbot